Independence Township may refer to:

Arkansas
Independence Township, Baxter County, Arkansas, in Baxter County, Arkansas
Independence Township, Lee County, Arkansas, in Lee County, Arkansas

Illinois
Independence Township, Saline County, Illinois

Iowa
Independence Township, Appanoose County, Iowa
Independence Township, Hamilton County, Iowa
Independence Township, Jasper County, Iowa
Independence Township, Palo Alto County, Iowa

Kansas
Independence Township, Doniphan County, Kansas
Independence Township, Montgomery County, Kansas, in Montgomery County, Kansas
Independence Township, Osborne County, Kansas, in Osborne County, Kansas
Independence Township, Washington County, Kansas, in Washington County, Kansas

Michigan
Independence Township, Michigan

Missouri
Independence Township, Dunklin County, Missouri
Independence Township, Macon County, Missouri, in Macon County, Missouri
Independence Township, Nodaway County, Missouri
Independence Township, Schuyler County, Missouri

Ohio
Defunct townships of Cuyahoga County, Ohio 
Independence Township, Washington County, Ohio

New Jersey
Independence Township, New Jersey

Pennsylvania
Independence Township, Beaver County, Pennsylvania
Independence Township, Washington County, Pennsylvania

South Dakota
 Independence Township, Day County, South Dakota, in Day County, South Dakota
 Independence Township, Douglas County, South Dakota, in Douglas County, South Dakota

See also
 Independent Township (disambiguation)

Township name disambiguation pages